Flint is a 2017 television drama film based on the Flint water crisis in Flint, Michigan. Directed by Bruce Beresford, it premiered on Lifetime on October 28, 2017. The film stars Queen Latifah, Betsy Brandt, Jill Scott, and Marin Ireland. The film or its cast have been nominated for three Image Awards, a Critics' Choice Television Award and a Primetime Emmy Award.

Production

In January 2017, the singer and actress Cher announced plans to produce and star in a film about a fictional Flint woman dealing with the water crisis and how it affects her family. Cher dropped out of the project in March, citing a "serious family issue" as the cause. Queen Latifah and Jill Scott were later cast in the film. Latifah's production company Flavor Unit Entertainment and her partner Shakim Compere also produced the film. Lyndie Greenwood later joined the cast. It is based on the Time magazine cover story "The Poisoning of an American City". It premiered on October 28, 2017. Primary filming took place on location in Toronto and Hamilton, Ontario. Hamilton City Hall stood in as the city hall for Flint.

Reception

Accolades

References

External links

2017 television films
2017 films
Lifetime (TV network) films
American drama television films
Films set in Michigan
Films directed by Bruce Beresford
Films scored by John Debney
Environmental films
Films shot in Toronto
2010s American films